Football Canada is the governing body for amateur gridiron football in Canada headquartered in Ottawa, Ontario. Football Canada focuses primarily its own Canadian form of the sport, and is currently the world's only national governing body for Canadian football.

The governing body is also Canada's representative member of the International Federation of American Football (IFAF), the world's governing body for American football. In this capacity, it organizes the Canada men's national team which competes in IFAF competitions using American rules.

History

1880–1955, Canadian Rugby Union
The organization, which is now known as Football Canada, was founded on June 12, 1880, as the Canadian Rugby Football Union, revived on February 7, 1884, and re-organized as the Canadian Rugby Union on December 19, 1891.

The CRU was founded to govern a sport which at the time had rules similar to the rugby football being played in the United Kingdom.  In 1909, Albert Grey, 4th Earl Grey, Governor General of Canada, donated a trophy to the CRU to be awarded for the Rugby Football Championship of Canada.  This trophy became known as the Grey Cup.

Even by this time, however, the rules being played in Canada were vastly different from the rules used in countries that were part of the International Rugby Board (IRB).  In the years that followed, the CRU made numerous rule changes that resulted in a game reasonably similar to the American one but unrecognizable to a rugby union enthusiast.

In the early-1910s, CRU annual discussions dealing with rules changes due to the influence American football. The CRU elected W. A. Hewitt president for the 1915 season. He appointed a commission to establish uniforms rules of play at different levels including collegiate and senior. He approached multiple football coaches and sought feedback on best ways to implement standard playing rules. After the CRU did not operate from 1916 to 1918 due to World War I, Hewitt returned as president for the 1919 season. Due to disagreements on playing rules in Western Canada, lack of interest in Eastern Canada, and students prioritizing studies instead of intercollegiate sports; national playoffs were not held in 1919.

Despite the divergence, the sport continued to be referred to as rugby for many years. The CRU did not change its name despite the obvious confusion (rugby union was known as English rugby in Canada).  By the 1940s, however, another development was to cause further changes to the CRU's mandate.  It was now clear that two of its member leagues, the Interprovincial Rugby Football Union in Eastern Canada and the Western Interprovincial Football Union in the West were far more competitive than other circuits.

1956–1967, shift to amateur governance
By the 1950s, the two major unions had become openly professional, and in 1956 formed the Canadian Football Council (CFC) as an umbrella organization.  In 1958, the CFC seceded from the CRU and became the Canadian Football League, which was solely awarded the Grey Cup (though the amateurs had effectively been locked out since 1954). During the CFL's Grey Cup meetings in November 1966, the CRU transferred its ownership of the Grey Cup to a CFL trusteeship. In exchange, the CRU received $50,000 per year to assist the development of amateur football.

As an organization with no direct jurisdiction over the professional clubs and having become a distinct sport from rugby union by this time, the CRU changed its name to the Canadian Amateur Football Association (CAFA) in 1967.  The CAFA changed its name again to Football Canada in 1986.  In French, its name had long been Football Canada.

Provincial members
 British Columbia Provincial Football Association
 Football Alberta
 Football Saskatchewan
 Football Manitoba
 Ontario Football Alliance
 Football Quebec
 Football New Brunswick
 Football Prince Edward Island
 Football Newfoundland and Labrador
 Football Nova Scotia

Associate members
 Canadian Football League
 Canadian Football Officials Association
 U Sports
 Canadian Junior Football League

National championships
 Football Canada Cup
 Flag Football National Championships
 6 Nations Challenge
 Women's Challenge Cup

National teams
Men's 
 Junior National Team
 Senior Flag Football National Team

Women's 
 Women's National Team
 Senior Flag Football National Team

Former national teams
 Senior National Men's Team

International Bowl series
First played in 2014, the annual International Bowl series is a collaboration between Football Canada and USA Football featuring a series of exhibition games between the rival football nations in Texas in January and February. The event built on the previous International Bowl (2010 – 2013) format of Team USA vs. Team World.

Canada's under-18 team for the International Bowl is selected from the top players and coaches at the prior summer's Football Canada Cup.

National Coaching Certification Program
Football Canada offers coaches training through the National Coaching Certification Program (NCCP) for flag, touch and tackle football.

NCCP streams
 Community Sport
 Competition-Introduction
 Competition-Development

Safe Contact
As part of its NCCP program, Football Canada's Safe Contact module teaches safe contact tackling and blocking as well as concussion education. In 2014, the organization partnered with the CFL to further refine the program.

Champions prior to 1909
These are the CRU champions before the dedication of the Grey Cup.

 1892 – Osgoode Hall (Ontario) defeated Montreal (Quebec)
 1893 – Queen's University (Ontario) defeated Montreal (Quebec)
 1894 – Ottawa University (Quebec) defeated Queen's University (Ontario)
 1895 – Toronto University (Ontario) defeated Montreal (Quebec)
 1896 – Ottawa University (Quebec) defeated Toronto University (Ontario)
 1897 – Ottawa University (Quebec) defeated Hamilton (Ontario)
 1898 – Ottawa (Ontario) defeated Toronto University (Intercollegiate), Ottawa (Ontario) defeated Ottawa University (Quebec)
 1899 – No game.
 1900 – Ottawa (Ontario) defeated Brockville (Quebec)
 1901 – Ottawa University (Quebec) defeated Argonauts (Ontario)
 1902 – Ottawa (Ontario) defeated Ottawa University (Quebec)
 1903 – No game.
 1904 – No game.
 1905 – Toronto University (Intercollegiate) defeated Ottawa (Quebec)
 1906 – Hamilton (Ontario) defeated McGill University (Intercollegiate)
 1907 – Montreal (Interprovincial) defeated Peterborough (Ontario)
 1908 – Hamilton (Interprovincial) defeated Toronto University (Intercollegiate)

The 1909 game was the first game for the Grey Cup. See the article 'List of Grey Cup champions' for the complete Grey Cup listing.

Source: Ottawa Citizen, November 28, 1910, page 8.

See also 
Canadian Football
U Sports football
U Sports
Canadian Colleges Athletic Association
Canadian Junior Football League
Quebec Junior Football League
Rugby Canada
Canadian Football League
Comparison of Canadian and American football

References

External links
 

Canadian football
Sports governing bodies in Canada
Sports governing bodies by sport
Sports organizations established in 1880